McAlpin, West Virginia may refer to the following communities in the U.S. state of West Virginia:
McAlpin, Harrison County, West Virginia
McAlpin, Raleigh County, West Virginia